Lynn Township is a township in Lehigh County, Pennsylvania. It is the largest township by area in Lehigh County and also the most rural and least densely populated township in the county. The population of Lynn Township was 4,229 at the 2010 census. It is a suburb of Allentown in the Lehigh Valley, which had a population of 861,899 and was the 68th most populous metropolitan area in the U.S. as of the 2020 census.

Geography

The township is in the northwest corner of Lehigh County. Blue Mountain separates it from Schuylkill County in the north. It is in the Delaware River watershed and drained by Ontelaunee Creek and Kistler Creek to the Schuylkill River via Maiden Creek, except for the area near the boundary with Weisenberg Township that is drained by Switzer Creek via Jordan Creek into the Lehigh River.

Its villages include Jacksonville, Lochland (also in Heidelberg Township), Lynnville, Lynnport, New Tripoli (pronounced nu trih-PO-lee), Stines Corners (also in Weisenberg), and Wanamakers.

Adjacent municipalities
Heidelberg Township (east)
Lowhill Township (tangent to the east)
Weisenberg Township (southeast)
Albany Township (southwest)
West Penn Township (north)
East Penn Township (tangent to the northeast)

Climate
Lynn Township has a humid continental climate (Dfa/Dfb) and the hardiness zones are 6a and 6b.

Demographics

As of the census of 2000, there were 3,849 people, 1,397 households, and 1,071 families residing in the township.  The population density was 92.9 people per square mile (35.9/km).  There were 1,453 housing units at an average density of 35.1/sq mi (13.5/km).  The racial makeup of the township was 98.08% White, 0.23% African American, 0.10% Native American, 0.23% Asian, 0.42% from other races, and 0.94% from two or more races. Hispanic or Latino of any race were 1.12% of the population.

There were 1,397 households, out of which 37.9% had children under the age of 18 living with them, 66.4% were married couples living together, 6.7% had a female householder with no husband present, and 23.3% were non-families. 18.3% of all households were made up of individuals, and 7.5% had someone living alone who was 65 years of age or older.  The average household size was 2.75 and the average family size was 3.13.

In the township, the population was spread out, with 26.2% under the age of 18, 6.9% from 18 to 24, 30.6% from 25 to 44, 25.4% from 45 to 64, and 11.0% who were 65 years of age or older.  The median age was 38 years. For every 100 females, there were 102.3 males.  For every 100 females age 18 and over, there were 101.6 males. The median income for a household in the township was $53,883, and the median income for a family was $61,520. Males had a median income of $38,510 versus $29,866 for females. The per capita income for the township was $22,688.  About 2.1% of families and 4.1% of the population were below the poverty line, including 8.3% of those under age 18 and none of those age 65 or over.

History
Lynn Township was established in 1732, a part of what was known as the Allemängel (or Allemaengel). Its settlers early were predominantly German and Swiss. The Kistler Valley area of Lynn Township is named after Johaness Jeorg Kistler who came to the United States in 1737 from Palatinate Germany. The Frederick and Catherine Leaser Farm was added to the National Register of Historic Places in 2004.

Public education
The township is served by the Northwestern Lehigh School District.

Government
Legislators:
State Representative Gary Day, 187th district, Republican
State Senator Pat Browne, 16th district, Republican
US Representative Susan Wild, 7th district, Democrat

Transportation

Numbered routes in Lynn Township include Pennsylvania Route 143, Pennsylvania Route 309, and Pennsylvania Route 863. Other local roads of note include Kistler Valley Road/Holbens Valley Road, Mountain Road/Mosserville Road, Owl Valley Road, Schochary Road, and Sechler Road.

Resources
Lynn Township is served by two volunteer fire companies: the Community Fire Company of New Tripoli and the Lynnport Fire Company. Emergency medical services are provided by Cetronia Ambulance Corps. Law enforcement is provided by the Pennsylvania State Police from the Fogelsville Barracks. The local newspaper is The Northwestern Press. New Tripoli houses a bank and a post office as well.

In addition to a number of one-room schoolhouses and traditional Pennsylvania Dutch farms, local attractions include:
Bear Rock Junction, New Tripoli
Blue Mountain Vineyards, New Tripoli
Carriage Museum, New Tripoli
Eight Oaks Craft Distillers, New Tripoli
Leaser Lake
Olde Homestead Golf Course, New Tripoli
Ontelaunee Park, New Tripoli
Ontelaunee Rod & Gun Club, New Tripoli
Zeisloff Log House, New Tripoli

Recreation
The Appalachian National Scenic Trail passes along the northern portion of the township, and a very small portion of the Pennsylvania State Game Lands Number 106 is located in the northwestern corner of the township.

Notable person

Augustus Frederick Sherman, former Ellis Island official

References

External links

1753 establishments in Pennsylvania
Populated places established in 1753
Townships in Lehigh County, Pennsylvania
Townships in Pennsylvania